A large number of bombings have taken place in Mogadishu, Somalia, especially since the beginning of the Somali Civil War. They include:

 Somalia War (2006–2009)
 2008 Mogadishu bombing

 Somali Civil War (2009–present)
 May 2010 Mogadishu bombings
 2011 Mogadishu bombing
 Sahafi Hotel attacks
 November 2016 Mogadishu car bombing
 December 2016 Mogadishu suicide bombing
 2 January 2017 Mogadishu bombings
 Dayah Hotel attack
 February 2017 Mogadishu bombing
 14 October 2017 Mogadishu bombings
 28 October 2017 Mogadishu attacks
 February 2018 Mogadishu attacks
 March 2018 Mogadishu bombing
 2 September 2018 Mogadishu bombing
 4 February 2019 Mogadishu bombing
 28 February 2019 Mogadishu bombings
 22 July 2019 Mogadishu bombing
 24 July 2019 Mogadishu bombing
 December 2019 Mogadishu bombing
 March 2021 Mogadishu bombing
 June 2021 Mogadishu bombing
 November 2021 Mogadishu bombing
 April 2022 Mogadishu bombing
 August 2022 Mogadishu attack
 October 2022 Mogadishu bombings
 November 2022 Mogadishu attack

See also
 Battle of Mogadishu (disambiguation)